Heather Miller may refer to:
Heather Miller (athlete) (born 1987), American athlete
Heather Miller (businessperson) (born 1966), American businesswoman